In algebraic geometry, the syntomic topology is a Grothendieck topology introduced by .

Mazur defined a morphism to be syntomic if it is flat and locally a complete intersection.  The syntomic topology is generated by surjective syntomic morphisms of affine schemes.

References

External links
Explanation of the word "syntomic" by Barry Mazur.

Algebraic geometry